Norbert Theo Kohler (31 March 1930 – 13 March 2003) was a German wrestler. He competed in the men's Greco-Roman bantamweight at the 1952 Summer Olympics, representing Saar.

References

External links
 

1930 births
2003 deaths
German male sport wrestlers
Olympic wrestlers of Saar
Wrestlers at the 1952 Summer Olympics
People from Südwestpfalz
Sportspeople from Rhineland-Palatinate